Kirsten Brosbøl (born 14 December 1977 in Odder) is a Danish politician. She represented the Social Democrats in the Folketing from 2005 to 2019, and served as Minister for the Environment from 2014 to 2015.

Political career 
From 2001 to 2004, Brosbøl worked as a student assistant for the Social Democrats in the Folketing, and from 2004 to 2005 she worked as a political consultant for the Danish Social Democrats in the European Parliament. She was first elected into parliament at the 2005 Danish general election with 5,479 votes. She sat in parliament until 2019. From 2014 to 2015 she served as Minister for the Environment.

Personal life 
Kirsten Brosbøl was born in Odder, Denmark. Her father is bricklayer and shoemaker Lars Peter Brosbøl and her mother is nurse Bente Skødt Jensen. She studied mathematics at Odder Gymnasium. She has a cand.scient.soc. degree in sociology with a focus on international development from Roskilde University (1997–2005), and an MA in peace and conflict studies from the University of Sussex in the United Kingdom (2002–2003).

References

External links 
 on the website of the Danish Parliament (Folketinget)

1977 births
Living people
Alumni of the University of Sussex
People from Odder Municipality
Government ministers of Denmark
Danish Ministers for the Environment
Social Democrats (Denmark) politicians
Roskilde University alumni
Women government ministers of Denmark
Women members of the Folketing
21st-century Danish women politicians
Members of the Folketing 2005–2007
Members of the Folketing 2007–2011
Members of the Folketing 2011–2015
Members of the Folketing 2015–2019
20th-century Danish women